Sir William Smith (1568–1620), of Blackfriars and The Strand, London and Whadborough, Leicestershire; later of Hammersmith, Middlesex and Lower Cumberloe Green, Hertfordshire, was an English politician.

He was a Member (MP) of the Parliament of England for Aylesbury in 1604.

References

1568 births
1620 deaths
16th-century English people
Politicians from London
People from Harborough District
People from Hammersmith
People from North Hertfordshire District
English MPs 1604–1611